Harold W. Spaet (born August 1, 1944) is an American politician. He served as a Democratic member for the 101st and 105th district of the Florida House of Representatives.

Spaet attended the University of Miami, where he earned a bachelor's degree in 1966, and the University of Miami School of Law, where he earned a Juris Doctor in 1969. In 1978, Spaet was elected for the 101st district of the Florida House of Representatives, succeeding Paul B. Steinberg. In 1982, Spaet was succeeded by Michael I. Abrams in the 101st District and elected for the 105th district. He was succeeded by Alberto Gutman in 1984.

References 

1944 births
Living people
Place of birth missing (living people)
Democratic Party members of the Florida House of Representatives
20th-century American politicians
University of Miami alumni
University of Miami School of Law alumni